Le Dictionnaire universel des créatrices (English: The Universal Dictionary of Creatives) is a French biographical dictionary book devoted to creative women, initiated in 2010 and published in 2013. There are three volumes of 4,900 pages, that were written by 1,600 contributors. More than 10,000 women biographies are included in the book. UNESCO has sponsored the book publication.

In 2015, an e-book digital version was released with some 200+ additional biographies added.

Bibliography

See also 
 Dictionary of Women Worldwide
 Women in World History

References 

Biographical dictionaries of women
2013 non-fiction books
French biographical dictionaries
History of women in France